Big Slough Creek Bridge is an historic structure located near the town of Nichols in rural Muscatine County, Iowa, United States.  The concrete rigid frame bridge was built in 1937.  It was designed by Otto Wendling of the Iowa State Highway Commission.  The bridge was listed on the National Register of Historic Places in 1998 as a part of the Highway Bridges of Iowa MPS.

Gallery

References

Bridges completed in 1937
Bridges in Muscatine County, Iowa
Deck arch bridges in the United States
National Register of Historic Places in Muscatine County, Iowa
Road bridges on the National Register of Historic Places in Iowa
Concrete bridges in the United States